Madame Hydra is the name of several different fictional supervillains appearing in American comic books published by Marvel Comics. It is a name given to a top female operative of HYDRA.

Fictional character biography

Ophelia Sarkissian 

This operative of HYDRA may have impressed her superiors enough that, after only a short time in the organization, they promoted her to the level of Madame Hydra VI (the identities of Madames Hydra I through V, who rank above her, are unknown). One of her first missions as Madame Hydra was to capture Nick Fury and deliver him to the Deltites, a group of artificially created duplicates which were taking over S.H.I.E.L.D. After failing in her mission and discovering that the Deltites were manipulating her, she allied with the S.H.I.E.L.D. agents against the takeover. She was later turned over to federal authorities and was found to be criminally insane, and sent to Arnold Sanitarium for psychiatric treatment (the same sanitarium that Bigfoot was later imprisoned in).

Valentina Allegra de Fontaine 

Valentina Allegra de Fontaine succeeded Viper as Madame Hydra. She wears an elaborate tentacle headdress and elaborate HYDRA robes.

Elisa Sinclair 

Elisa Sinclair has appeared in Captain America's implanted memories that the Red Skull's clone and Kobik placed in him to make Captain America think that he is a HYDRA sleeper agent. She is depicted as an ancient being with magical powers that had an extensive reach.

In the present, Elisa intercepts the Taskmaster and Eric O'Grady's Life Model Decoy counterpart the Black Ant who were on their way to present evidence of Captain America's brainwashing to Maria Hill. After keeping the Taskmaster and the Black Ant alive and persuading them to become her personal guards, Elisa then collects a new HYDRA High Council consisting of herself, a new Kraken, the Gorgon, the Hive, the Viper, Baron Helmut Zemo, Arnim Zola, and Doctor Faustus.

During the "Opening Salvo" part of the Secret Empire storyline, Elisa reunites with Captain America after he overthrew the Red Skull for leadership of HYDRA. While in her study room following HYDRA's takeover of the United States, Elisa uses her magic spells to counter every one of Doctor Strange's attempts to bring down the Darkforce dome that is surrounding Manhattan. While having tea with Captain America, Elisa is informed of Captain America's suspicion about Baron Zemo and Doctor Faustus' disloyalty. Elisa brushes off the suspicion and tells Captain America that they plan to assemble the Cosmic Cube in order to restore Earth to their vision. Elisa later gives Captain America the updates on the members of HYDRA's Avengers. She tells him that the Scarlet Witch has become unhinged due to her being possessed by Chthon, the Vision is still kept under HYDRA's control through Arnim Zola's A.I. Virus, and Odinson is still praying to Odin about his troubles, like Jane Foster being trapped in an alternate reality. As Captain America prepares to leave, Elisa tells Captain America that he has become like a son to her. During HYDRA's attack on the Underground's base at the Mount, Elisa detects an unusual amount of energy in the Mount and rushes in. Madame Hydra arrives and teleports Captain America away at the last second as the Tony Stark A.I. explodes, where it destroys the base and Madame Hydra.

Other versions

Heroes Reborn 
In the Heroes Reborn reality, Madame Hydra is a terrorist leader. She answers to HYDRA's leader the Mandarin, who is actually a robot built by Doctor Doom. She is killed in battle against Iron Man.

In other media

Television 
 The Viper incarnation of Madame Hydra appears in X-Men: Evolution, voiced by Lisa Ann Beley.
 The Viper incarnation of Madame Hydra and Valentina Allegra de Fontaine appear in The Avengers: Earth's Mightiest Heroes, with the former voiced by Vanessa Marshall while the latter has no dialogue.

Film 
 Valentina Allegra de Fontaine and Viper appear in Nick Fury: Agent of S.H.I.E.L.D., portrayed by Lisa Rinna and Sandra Hess respectively.
 A Mutant variation of Viper appears in The Wolverine, portrayed by Svetlana Khodchenkova.

Marvel Cinematic Universe 

Variations of individuals who have used the Madame Hydra alias in the comics appear in media set in the Marvel Cinematic Universe (MCU):
 A variation of Ophelia / Madame Hydra appears in the fourth season of the TV series Agents of S.H.I.E.L.D. as an alias for the AI Aida, portrayed by Mallory Jansen.
 Valentina Allegra de Fontaine appears in the Disney+ miniseries The Falcon and The Winter Soldier and the films Black Widow and Black Panther: Wakanda Forever portrayed by Julia Louis-Dreyfus. Dreyfus is set to reprise her role in the film Thunderbolts.

Video games 
 Madame Hydra appears as a boss in Captain America: Super Soldier, voiced by Audrey Wasilewski.
 Viper appears as the first boss in Marvel: Avengers Alliance.
 Viper appears as a boss in Marvel: Avengers Alliance Tactics.
 Madame Hydra appears in Marvel Heroes, voiced by Tasia Valenza.
 Viper appears in Lego Marvel Super Heroes, voiced by Kari Wahlgren.
 Viper appears in Lego Marvel's Avengers.
 Madame Hydra appears as a boss in Marvel Avengers Academy.
 The Viper incarnation of Madame Hydra appears in Marvel Powers United VR, voiced again by Vanessa Marshall.

Miscellaneous 
 The Viper incarnation of Madame Hydra appears in the Spider-Woman: Agent of S.W.O.R.D. motion comic, voiced by Nicolette Reed.
 Madame Hydra appears in the Marvel Universe: LIVE! arena show.

Merchandise 
An action figure of the Viper incarnation of Madame Hydra was released in Hasbro's "Marvel Legends" line as part of the "Marvel's Madames" sub-line.

References

External links 
 Madame Hydra (Heroes Reborn) at Marvel Wiki
 Madame Hydra (Elisa Sinclair) at Marvel Wiki
 Madame Hydra VI at Marvel Appendix

Set index articles on comics
Marvel Comics female supervillains